Hulett Carlson Smith (October 21, 1918 – January 15, 2012) was an American politician who served as the 27th Governor of West Virginia from 1965 to 1969.

Biography
The son of West Virginia Congressman Joe L. Smith, Hulett C. Smith was born in Beckley, West Virginia. Smith attended public schools in Raleigh County, and graduated with honors from the University of Pennsylvania's Wharton School of Finance and Administration, where he majored in economics. Following his graduation from the Wharton School, Smith worked in the insurance business and at his family's radio station. During World War II he served in the U.S. Navy, rising to the rank of lieutenant, and ultimately became a lieutenant commander in the U.S. Naval Reserve.

Active in community service and civic affairs, he served as president of The West Virginia Junior Chamber of Commerce (1949–1950). He was the chairman of the West Virginia Democratic Party from 1956 to 1962. During this time Smith co-founded Bald Knob Ski Slopes, the predecessor to Winterplace Ski Resort.  He was elected governor in 1964 and served for one term. Due to term limits in place at that time, he was unable to run for a second term in 1968. After his term as governor, Smith served as a Presidential elector in 1992; he was also on the slate of George McGovern's electors in 1972.

In 1968, Smith responded to the bombing of the gymnasium at Bluefield State College by offering a $5,000 reward for information leading to conviction of the culprits.

Smith died in Scottsdale, Arizona at the age of 93.

References

External links 
 Biography of Hulett C. Smith 
 Inaugural Address of Hulett C. Smith

|-

1918 births
2012 deaths
United States Navy personnel of World War II
American Presbyterians
Democratic Party governors of West Virginia
Military personnel from Beckley, West Virginia
Politicians from Beckley, West Virginia
State political party chairs of West Virginia
United States Navy officers
United States Navy reservists
Wharton School of the University of Pennsylvania alumni
20th-century American politicians
Businesspeople from Beckley, West Virginia